Nelson Ira Norton (March 30, 1820 – October 28, 1887) was an American politician and a United States Representative from New York.

Early life
Born near Salamanca, in Great Valley, New York, Norton received a limited education and engaged in agricultural pursuits.

Career
Supervisor of Cattaraugus County in 1860 and 1865–1867, Norton was a Justice of the Peace from 1852 to 1870. He was a member of the New York State Assembly (Cattaraugus Co., 1st D.) in 1861 and 1862.

Norton was elected as a Republican to the 44th United States Congress to fill the vacancy caused by the death of Representative-elect Augustus F. Allen,  holding office from December 6, 1875 to March 3, 1877. Afterwards he resumed agricultural pursuits.

According to Mary Ermina Norton (Parker)'s obituary published June 30, 1911, (Wyoming County Herald, NY) Mary taught at Great Valley, NY, and it was here that she met Nelson Ira Norton whom she married 7 years later June 23, 1847. Norton formed a partnership with Alonzo Hawley in general merchandise. Mr. Norton was one of the first postmasters of the Town of Hinsdale, NY serving under James K. Polk and Zachary Taylor. He was a member of the Assembly from this district in 1861, and in 1872 was one of the presidential [ electors ]. He also served the legislature in 1872 to 1874. He was supervisor of the town of Hinsdale in the Years 1860-61-65-66-69. He was Justice of the Peace for 20 consecutive years and was serving the town in this capacity at the time of his death.

Death
Norton died on October 28, 1887 (age 67 years, 7 months, and 28 days). He is interred at the Hinsdale Cemetery, Hinsdale, New York.

Family life
Norton was the son of Ira and Lucy Perkins Norton. He married Mary E. Parker on February 15, 1847.

References

External links

1820 births
1887 deaths
Republican Party members of the New York State Assembly
People from Cattaraugus County, New York
Republican Party members of the United States House of Representatives from New York (state)
19th-century American politicians